Montanalestes is an extinct mammal known from the Cretaceous in North America.

Classification
Known from only six fossil teeth, Montanalestes is an example of the less well-preserved early eutherians found on the northern hemisphere, apparently more closely related to later eutherians than Prokennalestes, and Murtoilestes.

References

Prehistoric eutherians
Cretaceous mammals of North America
Cloverly fauna
Fossil taxa described in 1999
Prehistoric mammal genera